Consolidated Bank Ghana (CBG) is a commercial bank in Ghana. It is licensed by the Bank of Ghana, the central bank and national banking regulator.

Location
The headquarters and main branch of the bank are located on the First Floor, Manet Tower 3, Airport City, Accra. This location is immediately west of Kotoka International Airport. The geographical coordinates of the headquarters of CBG are:05°35'59.0"N, 0°10'38.0"W (Latitude:5.599722; Longitude:-0.177222).

Overview
Consolidated Bank Ghana Limited is a large financial services organization, serving large corporations, high net-worth individuals, non-governmental organizations, regular customers and small and medium sized enterprises. As of 31 December 2021, the bank had total assets of GHS:10,751,164,000 (US$1,449,578,900), with shareholders' equity of GHS:801,545,000 (US$108. 1 million). As of October 2019, CBG had 114 branches, 119 ATMs and approximately one million customers.

History
In September 2017, the Bank of Ghana directed all universal banks in Ghana to raise their minimum capital reserves from GHS:120 million (US$22.8 million) to GHS:400 million (US$73.4 million). Five banks that failed to meet the minimum requirements were merged, namely Construction Bank, Beige Bank, Royal Bank, UniBank and Sovereign Bank. On 1 August 2018, the banking licenses of those five banks were cancelled and their assets and selected liabilities were merged to form Consolidated Bank Ghana Limited. In addition, these five banks had committed regulatory breaches that made it impossible for them to operate as banking institutions, so Bank of Ghana closed them and fired their boards and senior management.

Recapitalization 
The Government of Ghana issued a bond worth GHS:5.76 billion (US$1.2 billion) to retire the debt of the insolvent five banks. In addition, the government availed Consolidated Bank with GHS:450 million (US$94.76 million) to serve as reserve capital.

Ownership  
Consolidated Bank Ghana Limited is 100 percent owned by the Government of Ghana.

Branches 
Consolidated Bank began operations with 148 branches in nine regions of Ghana. These were all branches of the five defunct banks the Bank of Ghana took over. By October 2019, the number of branches had been rationalized to 114.

Awards and recognitions 
In 2020 the bank was one of twelve institutions that  picked up honorary awards at the ninth Association of Ghana Industries (AGI) Ghana Industry and Quality Awards.

See also
 List of banks in Ghana
 Economy of Ghana

References

External links
 Official Website
  Consolidated Bank Ltd takes over assets of 5 collapsed banks As of 2 August 2018.

Banks of Ghana
Accra
Banks established in 2018
Ghanaian companies established in 2018